Murex hystricosus is a species of large predatory sea snail, a marine gastropod mollusk in the family Muricidae, the rock snails or murex snails.

Distribution
This marine species occurs off Sumatra, Indonesia.

References

 Houart, R.; Dharma, B. (2001). Description of Murex (Murex) hystricosus n.sp. (Gastropoda, Muricidae) from Sumatra, Indian Ocean. Novapex (Jodoigne) 2(2): 31-36 

Murex